Konte, or Konté, may refer to:

Surnames
Amadou Konte (born 1981), Malian-French footballer
Bai Konte (1920-1983), Gambia praise singer
Bassirou Konté (born 1988), Ivorian cyclist
Dembo Konte (died 2014), West African master kora player 
Mamadou Konte (died 2007), Senegalese music producer
Skip Konte (born 1947), American keyboardist

Others
Rowdy Ramudu Konte Krishnudu, a 1980 Telugu action film produced by N. T. Rama Rao